Qatar Gaz (also Romanized as Qaţār Gaz) is a village in Keybar Rural District, Jolgeh Zozan District, Khaf County, Razavi Khorasan Province, Iran. At the 2006 census, its population was 431, in 101 families.

References 

Populated places in Khaf County